The Kastler–Brossel Laboratory, located in Paris, France, is a research laboratory specializing in fundamental physics of quantum systems. Founded in 1951 by Alfred Kastler and Jean Brossel, it is a joint research unit operated by the French National Centre for Scientific Research (CNRS), the École normale supérieure, the Sorbonne University and the Collège de France.

Brief history
The laboratory was founded in 1951 by Alfred Kastler (Nobel Prize in Physics in 1966) and Jean Brossel on the theme of the interaction between light and matter. The initial name of laboratory was the « Laboratoire de spectroscopie Hertzienne de l'ENS ». It is located in the Department of Physics of École normale supérieure.

In 1967, a second site opened on the Jussieu campus.

In 1994, the laboratory changed its name to  « Laboratoire Kastler Brossel »  in honor of its two founders.

Now, the Kastler Brossel Laboratory (LKB) is one of the main actors in the field of fundamental physics of quantum systems.

Research activity
Many new themes have appeared recently in the field of fundamental physics of quantum systems, like quantum entanglement or Bose–Einstein condensation in gases, which leads to a constant renewal of the research carried out in the laboratory. Presently its activity takes several forms: cold atoms (bosonic and fermionics systems), atom lasers, quantum fluids, atoms in solid helium; quantum optics, cavity quantum electrodynamics; quantum information and quantum theory of measurement; quantum chaos; high-precision measurements. These themes lead not only to a better understanding of fundamental phenomena, but also to important applications, like more precise atomic clocks, improvement of detectors based on atomic interferometry or new methods for biomedical imaging.

Director and former directors
 Jean Brossel (1951–1984)
 Jacques Dupont-Roc (1984–1994)
 Michèle Leduc (1994–1999)
 Elisabeth Giacobino (1999–2000)
 Franck Laloë (2000–2006)
 Paul Indelicato (2006–2012)
 Antoine Heidmann (2012–...)

People 
Amongst current and past research staff there are : 
 4 Nobel Prize in Physics : Alfred Kastler (1966), Claude Cohen-Tannoudji (1997), Serge Haroche (2012), Alain Aspect (2022)
 6 CNRS gold medal : Alfred Kastler (1964),  Jean Brossel (1984),  Claude Cohen-Tannoudji (1996), Alain Aspect (2005), Serge Haroche (2009), Jean Dalibard (2021)
 6  Members of French Academy of Sciences : Alfred Kastler, Jean Brossel, Claude Cohen-Tannoudji, Serge Haroche, Marie-Anne Bouchiat, Jean Dalibard
 3 Professors at Collège de France : Claude Cohen-Tannoudji (1973), Serge Haroche (2001), Jean Dalibard (2013)

References

External links
 Site officiel du laboratoire

Physics laboratories
Research institutes in France
Buildings and structures in Paris
Laboratories in France